The 2016 Big West Conference women's basketball tournament took place March 8–12, 2016. The first two rounds occurred at Bren Events Center while the semifinals and championship were at the Honda Center in Anaheim, California. The winner of the tournament received the conference's automatic bid to the 2016 NCAA Women's Division I Basketball Tournament. 

CSUN were the defending champions, but were eliminated by Cal Poly in the first round.

Format
The top eight teams qualified for the 2016 Big West tournament. Seeds 1 and 2 received a double-bye while seeds 3 and 4 received a single bye. The first round featured 5 vs. 8 and 6 vs. 7. The lowest seed from round 1 moved on to play seed 3 in the quarterfinals while the other winner moved on to play seed 4 in the quarterfinals. The semifinals once again had the lowest seed from the quarterfinals move on to play seed 1  while the other remaining seed played seed 2 in the semifinals.

Bracket

References

Big West Conference women's basketball
Big West